Lampropeltis micropholis, commonly known as the Ecuadorian milk snake, is a species of milk snake.

It is found in Colombia, Costa Rica, Ecuador, Panama and possibly Venezuela.

References

micropholis
Snakes of South America
Reptiles of Colombia
Reptiles of Costa Rica
Reptiles of Ecuador
Reptiles of Panama
Reptiles described in 1860